Erik Sundborg better known by his stage name Eric Amarillo born in Kullavik south of Gothenburg, Sweden in 1971, is a musician, songwriter, music producer and DJ.

He is member of the Swedish house band duo The Attic, formed in 2003, alongside his childhood friend Michael Feiner.

In Spring 2011 he released a solo single on EMI label titled "Om sanningen ska fram" (meaning "If truth be told" in English) that reached the top of the Swedish Singles Chart on the chart dated 20 May 2011. The song also charted in Norway and Denmark.

Discography
For discography with his band, see The Attic

Albums

Singles

References

1971 births
Living people
Swedish songwriters
Swedish-language singers
Melodifestivalen contestants of 2007
Melodifestivalen contestants of 2006